The 22648 / 47 Thiruvananthapuram Central–Korba Express is a Express express train belonging to Indian Railways Southern zone that runs between  and  in India.

It operates as train number 22648 from Thiruvananthapuram Central to Korba and as train number 22647 in the reverse direction, serving the states of Kerala, Tamil Nadu, Andhra Pradesh, Telangana, Maharashtra & Chhattisgarh.

Coaches
The 22648 / 47  Thiruvananthapuram–Korba Express has one AC 2-tier, three AC 3-tier, 11 sleeper class, three general unreserved & two SLR (seating with luggage rake) coaches. It has a pantry car.

As is customary with most train services in India, coach composition may be amended at the discretion of Indian Railways depending on demand.

Schedule

Service

Routing
The 22648 / 47 runs from Thiruvananthapuram Central via ,
,
, 

Traction
As the route is fully electrified, an Erode or Royapuram-based WAP-4 or WAP-7 powers the train up to its entire journey.

References

External links
22648 Trivandrum Korba Express at India Rail Info
22647 Korba Trivandrum Express at India Rail Info

Express trains in India
Transport in Thiruvananthapuram
Rail transport in Kerala
Rail transport in Tamil Nadu
Rail transport in Andhra Pradesh
Rail transport in Telangana
Rail transport in Maharashtra
Rail transport in Chhattisgarh
Transport in Korba, Chhattisgarh